Marcelo Pereira Surcin (born 1 February 1971), known as Marcelinho Carioca, is a Brazilian former professional footballer who played as an attacking midfielder. He was noted for his accuracy from free-kicks, having scored 80 free kick goals in official matches during his career, the most by any player, earning him the nickname "Pé-de-Anjo" (Angel Foot).

The most successful player ever to play for Corinthians, he has scored 206 goals in 420 matches from 1994 to 2001. He has collected more trophies with Corinthians than any other player in their history, a total of 8 championships including 1998 and 1999 Brazilian National Championships and the first edition of FIFA Club World Cup, in 2000.
He scored 505 goals, in his entire career.

For all his club achievements, Marcelinho Carioca never succeeded in Brazil's national team and never played in a FIFA World Cup, making only four appearances for the national side between 1994 and 2001, and scoring two goals.

Marcelinho Carioca is also well known for his off-field antics, including frequent disputes with coaches (most famously with Vanderlei Luxemburgo), management, and teammates.

Club career

Corinthians
After winning 1990 Brazilian Cup, 1991 Rio de Janeiro State Championship and 1992 Brazilian National Championship as a Flamengo player, Marcelinho Carioca signed his first contract with Corinthians—who bought him from Flamengo for US$500.000,00 in December 1993. In mid-1997, after winning the Brazilian Cup (Copa do Brasil) and the São Paulo State Championship (Campeonato Paulista), he was sold to Valencia (ESP) for US$7,000,000 but unsuccessfully came back to Corinthians in the end of the year. Back to "Parque São Jorge" he was two times champion of the national championship (Campeonato Brasileiro, 98 and 99), one time state champion (2001), and raised the trophy of the first FIFA world club championship in 2000.

The second time he left the team seemed to be for good. After a few conflicts with teammates in mid-2001, he was accused of denigrating the clubs image, and left the squad. After training alone for some time in the club, he won in justice the opportunity to play for Santos FC, where he stayed for six months. In a legal dispute (for the 2001 incident), Corinthians won in first instance, obliging the player to pay R$9.000.000.

In February 2006, as part of a deal, he signed his third contract with Corinthians but only six months later, as of the arrival and request of manager Émerson Leão, Marcelinho Carioca was released. He was signed by Santo André the following year, where he stayed until 2009 winning promotion to Brazilian First Division in 2008 but being relegated the following year. He played a farewell match for Corinthians early in 2010 in a friendly against Huracán.

In 2012, he played four games for the Corinthians beach soccer team.

Career statistics

Club

International

Honours

Club
Flamengo
 Série A: 1992
 Copa do Brasil: 1990
 Campeonato Carioca: 1991

Corinthians
 Série A: 1998, 1999 
 Copa do Brasil: 1995
 Campeonato Paulista: 1995, 1997, 1999, 2001
 FIFA Club World Cup: 2000

Individual
 Bola de Ouro: 1999
 Bola de Prata: 1994, 1999, 2003
 South American Team of the Year: 1998

References

External links

1971 births
Living people
Brazilian expatriate footballers
Sport Club Corinthians Paulista players
CR Flamengo footballers
Santos FC players
Brasiliense Futebol Clube players
Esporte Clube Santo André players
CR Vasco da Gama players
Valencia CF players
Gamba Osaka players
Al Nassr FC players
AC Ajaccio players
Campeonato Brasileiro Série A players
Campeonato Brasileiro Série B players
J1 League players
La Liga players
Saudi Professional League players
Ligue 1 players
Expatriate footballers in Spain
Expatriate footballers in Japan
Expatriate footballers in Saudi Arabia
Expatriate footballers in France
Brazil under-20 international footballers
Brazil international footballers
Association football midfielders
Brazilian expatriate sportspeople in Spain
Brazilian expatriate sportspeople in Japan
Brazilian expatriate sportspeople in Saudi Arabia
Brazilian expatriate sportspeople in France
Footballers from Rio de Janeiro (city)
Brazilian footballers